Daddies is a 1924 American silent romantic comedy film produced and distributed by Warner Bros. and directed by William A. Seiter. The film stars Mae Marsh and Harry Myers and survives today in 16mm format. It was transferred onto 16mm film by Associated Artists Productions / United Artists in the 1950s and shown on television.

Plot
As described in a review in a film magazine, at a reunion of a bachelors’ club the five remaining members are shocked at the defection of one of their number, who pays his forfeit to get married. Another receives a letter that his chum, about to die, has left him his little girl, and the other three are persuaded to also adopt war orphans. Robert Audrey (Myers) finds his in an eighteen-year-old girl, Ruth (Marsh); old James Crockett (Gillingwater), who grudgingly accepts a boy, really gets a little girl, while Allen (Louis) finds three boys, triplets, have been awarded to him. These kiddies gradually work themselves into the affections of their foster parents until each one marries to provide a "mother" for the children. Finally Robert finds that he loves his "orphan," Ruth, and marries her, and the club goes to smash.

Cast

Box office
According to Warner Bros records, the film earned $367,000 domestically and $40,000 in foreign markets.

References

External links

Lobby card (archived)

1924 films
American silent feature films
American romantic comedy films
Warner Bros. films
1920s English-language films
Films directed by William A. Seiter
1924 romantic comedy films
American black-and-white films
1920s American films
Silent romantic comedy films
Silent American comedy films
English-language romantic comedy films